Richard Krebs (30 July 1906 – 29 June 1996) was a German sprinter who won a silver medal in the 4 × 400 m relay at the 1928 Summer Olympics. This was his only international competition. Domestically he finished third in the 400 m at the 1929 national championships.

References

1906 births
1996 deaths
German male sprinters
Olympic silver medalists for Germany
Athletes (track and field) at the 1928 Summer Olympics
Olympic athletes of Germany
Medalists at the 1928 Summer Olympics
Olympic silver medalists in athletics (track and field)